Iredell Independent School District is a public school district based in Iredell, Texas (USA).

Located in western Bosque County, the district extends into a small portion of Erath County.

The district has one school that serves students in grades pre-kindergarten through twelve.

Academic achievement
In 2015, the school was rated "Met Standard" by the Texas Education Agency.

Special programs

Athletics
Iredell High School plays six-man football.

See also

List of school districts in Texas 
List of high schools in Texas

References

External links
Iredell ISD

School districts in Bosque County, Texas
School districts in Erath County, Texas